Margaret Hasse (born 1950, in South Dakota), is a poet and writer who has lived and worked in Minnesota since graduating from Stanford University in 1973. Three of her collections of poems have been published: Milk and Tides (Nodin Press, 2008), In a Sheep's Eye, Darling (Milkweed Editions, 1988), and Stars Above, Stars Below (New Rivers Press, 1984.) Milk and Tides was a finalist for a 2009 Minnesota Book Award and won the Midwestern Independent Publishers' Association award in poetry.

Margaret Hasse has been awarded fellowships in poetry from the National Endowment for the Arts, The Loft Literary Center, Minnesota State Arts Board, and the McKnight Foundation. She has presented at the AWP Writers Conference and teaches at the nationally acclaimed Loft Literary Center.

Works
Milk and Tides, 

In a Sheep's Eye, Darling, 

Stars Above, Stars Below,

References
 Minnesota State Arts Board

External links
 

1950 births
Living people
American women poets
National Endowment for the Arts Fellows
Stanford University alumni
Poets from Minnesota
Poets from South Dakota
20th-century American poets
20th-century American women writers
21st-century American women